Akköy is a Turkish toponym meaning "white village" and may refer to:

 Akköy, Bismil
 Akköy, Denizli, a town and district of Denizli Province, Turkey
 Akköy, Didim, a village in Aydın Province, Turkey
 Akköy, Ezine
 Akköy, İnhisar, a village in Bilecik Province, Turkey
 Akköy, Mudanya
 Akköy, Yenice
 Akköy Dam, a dam in Kayseri Province, Turkey